Ta Erotika Sakis Rouvas (Greek: Τα Ερωτικά; English: Love songs) is the first love song collection and fifth compilation album by Greek pop-rock singer-songwriter Sakis Rouvas and is part of the Universal Music Greece series Ta Erotika. It was released on 10 February 2007 and comprises songs from his first five albums released under the former PolyGram Records Greece. The album comprises 18 tracks with a love oriented theme.

Track listing
"Xana"
"Mi M'agapiseis"
"Aima, Dakrya & Idrotas"
"Afiste Tin"
"Par'ta"
"To Xero Ise Moni"
"Kapote Tha 'Maste Mazi"
"Ime Hamenos"
"Mia Fora"
"Ego S'agapo"
"Fyge"
"De Tha Se Xehaso"
"Pseftika"
"Mia Vrohi"
"Oso Iparheis"
"Dose Mou Mia Nyhta"
"Spasmeni Klidaria"
"Yia Sena"

External links
 Sakis Rouvas' official site

Albums produced by Nikos Karvelas
Albums produced by Nikos Terzis
Greek-language albums
Rouvas, Sakis
Sakis Rouvas compilation albums
2007 compilation albums
Universal Music Greece compilation albums
Mercury Records compilation albums